An analgesic adjuvant is a medication that is typically used for indications other than pain control but provides control of pain in some painful diseases. For instance, caffeine has minimal analgesic effect on its own, but may have an adjuvant effect when given with paracetamol (acetaminophen). Examples include:

 Anticonvulsants
 carbamazepine, gabapentin, pregabalin
 Antidepressants
 amitriptyline, duloxetine, venlafaxine
 Antihistamines
 hydroxyzine, promethazine
 Stimulants
 caffeine, cocaine, dextroamphetamine, ephedrine

 carisoprodol
 cyclobenzaprine
 hyoscine (scopolamine) 

The exact mechanism of the anticonvulsants carbamazepine, gabapentin, and pregabalin is unclear, but they are used to treat neuropathic pain with differing degrees of success.

Antiemetics and medication to relieve constipation are two examples of non-adjuvant medication indications because these are used to treat side effects and adverse effects.

References

External links

WHO Guidelines on the Pharmacological Treatment of Persisting Pain in Children with Medical Illnesses, (2012), World Health Organization 

Nociception
Sensory systems
Suffering
Acute pain
Analgesics
Adjuvants